Jerry Jones Guitars was a musical instrument manufacturer (mostly guitars) based in Nashville, Tennessee, United States.

The company specialized in making electric guitars and basses based on Danelectro's designs from the 1950s and 1960s. They also made some more unusual instruments such as six-string bass guitars, baritone guitars, sitar guitars, the shorty octave 12-string and the guitarlin, which is a hybrid of a guitar and a mandolin.

Many of the company's instrument designs borrowed heavily from the early designs.

In the spring of 2011, Jerry Jones announced that he was retiring and closing the factory. By May, the manufacturing equipment was sold.

Instruments

Guitars
Shorthorn guitar
Single-cutaway guitar

Basses
Longhorn 4-string bass
Longhorn 6-string bass
Shorthorn 4-string bass
Single cutaway 6-string bass

Baritones
Shorthorn baritone
Single-cutaway baritone

12-strings
Single-cutaway 12-string
Shorty octave 12-string

Sitars
Supreme sitar
Master sitar
Baby sitar

Other
Guitarlin

External links
Official site

Guitar manufacturing companies of the United States
Manufacturing companies based in Nashville, Tennessee